Usha Sinha is an Indian politician. She was elected to the Lok Sabha, lower house of the Parliament of India from Vaishali, Bihar as member of the Janata Dal. However she joined breakaway led by Chandrsekhar and became the Union Minister of State, Tourism.She contested the 1991 elections as an Indian National Congress but lost to Sheo Sharan Singh.

References

External links
Official biographical sketch in Parliament of India website

India MPs 1989–1991
1946 births
Lok Sabha members from Bihar
Living people
Janata Dal politicians
Samajwadi Janata Party politicians
Bihar MLAs 1985–1990
Women members of the Lok Sabha
Women members of the Bihar Legislative Assembly
20th-century Indian women
20th-century Indian people